Agonidium betsileo is a species of ground beetle in the subfamily Platyninae. It was described by Alluaud in 1932.

References

betsileo
Beetles described in 1932